The Citroën ë-Berlingo is a battery-electric version of the Berlingo range of car-based light commercial vehicle (LCV) and multi purpose vehicles (MPV) manufactured and sold by Citroën. Rebadged versions are sold by other marques within Stellantis as the Peugeot e-Partner, Opel/Vauxhall Combo-e, and Fiat E-Doblò; in addition, Toyota sells a rebadged version as the Toyota ProAce City Electric.

The Berlingo range were first introduced in 1996, and a battery-electric version followed in 1998 as the Citroën Berlingo électrique, which was sold until 2005. Another electric LCV variant of the first generation was delivered to La Poste in 2010 as the Berlingo First Electric, built in partnership with Venturi Automobiles but not sold commercially. The second-generation Berlingo was introduced in 2008 and an electric LCV version was shown in 2012 as the Berlingo Electric, developed in partnership with Mitsubishi Motors, followed by the E-Berlingo Multispace as a 5-passenger MPV in 2017. The third-generation Berlingo was introduced in 2018 and the electric versions, developed within Stellantis, were introduced in 2021, led by the ë-Berlingo.

History

First generation

Berlingo électrique

The Berlingo électrique was sold from 1998 to 2005. Energy was stored in a 162 V NiCd battery.

Powered by Venturi

Venturi Automobiles partnered with PSA Group to develop electric vehicles in response to a 2007 tender by the French postal service La Poste. Prototypes, based on the production Citroën Berlingo First and Peugeot Partner Origin light commercial vans, were built and tested in 2008. La Poste awarded the contract to PSA Group in 2009 and 250 examples of the Berlingo First Electric "Powered by Venturi" were delivered in 2010. Venturi developed the battery-electric drive train. It was also rebadged as a Peugeot Partner Origin "Powered by Venturi".

The drivetrain components (motor and battery) fit into the front compartment, giving the PSA/Venturi Berlingo Electric the same cargo volume as the conventional Berlingo. The onboard charger had a maximum power input capacity of 3.2 kW.

To demonstrate its technologies, a specially-prepared Berlingo "Powered by Venturi" was driven from Shanghai to Paris by Xavier Chevrin and Géraldine Gabin between 3 May and 13 July 2010, covering a distance of  without assistance. Chevrin followed that feat by driving a similar electric Berlingo  in May 2012 from Kilimanjaro to Okavango; the Kilimanjaro–Okavango Berlingo also carried three "Zebra" batteries.

Second generation

Berlingo Electric

In 2010, PSA and Mitsubishi announced they were jointly developing LCV EVs. An all-new Citroën Berlingo Electric light commercial panel van was shown at the Hanover Motor Show in September 2012. At the same time, PSA Group sibling Peugeot unveiled a rebadged version as the Peugeot Partner Electric. Citroën and Peugeot had been selling rebadged versions of the battery-electric Mitsubishi i-MiEV as the C-Zero and iOn, respectively; the drivetrain of the Berlingo / Partner Electric was similar to the i-MiEV.

Total estimated driving range was  under the New European Driving Cycle. They are equipped with two vehicle inlets for charging: a CHAdeMO DC fast-charging port above one rear wheel, replacing the fuel filler port, and a Type 2 connector above one front wheel. The Berlingo / Partner Electric were the first battery-electric light commercial vehicles marketed by PSA Group since the first-generation-based Berlingo électrique had been discontinued in 2005. They were released in the United Kingdom in April 2013.

In 2016 worldwide sales were 491, with just 19 sold in the UK.

Also in 2017, an electric version of the Berlingo Multispace multi purpose vehicle (MPV) was announced, which transplanted the EV drivetrain from the Berlingo Electric panel van to the MPV, gaining a second row of seats for passengers and windows all around; the prototype MPV was named the Citroën E-Berlingo. A rebadged version of the electric MPV was available as the Peugeot Partner Tepee Electric.

Third generation

ë-Berlingo

In 2020, PSA Group confirmed that electric versions of the third-generation Berlingo would be launched in 2021. On 14 January 2021, Citroën unveiled the electric ë-Berlingo Van, based on the third-generation Berlingo, which was followed 6 days later by the Opel Combo-e Cargo and the Vauxhall Combo-e, and again 6 days later by the Peugeot e-Partner LCV. On 26 February 2021 Peugeot introduced e-Rifter MPV, and on 4 May 2021, Toyota unveiled ProAce City Electric (LCV) and ProAce City Verso Electric (MPV). Fiat unveiled their re-badged version, the E-Doblò, in June 2022.

In January 2022, Stellantis announced they were discontinuing all diesel-powered passenger (MPV) versions of the Citroën Berlingo, including the Vauxhall/Opel Combo Life and the Peugeot Rifter, in the United Kingdom and European Union, leaving only the battery-electric variants in those markets.

The standard on-board charger has a maximum input power of 7.4 kW (AC); this can be upgraded to accept 11 kW (AC) and 100 kW (DC).

The vehicle is available in two sizes; the larger XL has an extended wheelbase and is  longer overall, accommodating 7 people in passenger form, while the shorter M accommodates 5. Behind the second row, the cargo area is either , for the M or XL, respectively.

References

External links

Berlingo Electric
Electric trucks
Electric vans